The , referred to from hereon as "Kōhaku", was aired on December 31, 2009 from NHK Hall in Japan.

Performers
The singers, announced on November 23, 2009, are ordered below according to the gojūon.
Names in bold letters did not perform in the preceding year's program.

Results
The winners were the white team, making it their 5th consecutive win. The table below documents the voting and points distribution:

Special guests
From the Kodomo (children's) Kōhaku Uta Gassen:
Seishiro Kato
Maya Sakura
Nozomi Ōhashi
Snow Prince Gasshoudan (Chorus)
Additional guests:
Susan Boyle
Ai Sugiyama
Mitsuko Mori
Tatsunori Hara
Hakuhō Shō
Toshiyuki Nishida
Kyoko Fukada
Eikichi Yazawa
Shirota Yuu

See also
Kōhaku Uta Gassen
51st Japan Record Awards

References

NHK Kōhaku Uta Gassen events
NHK
K